Guy Gardner may refer to:
 Guy Gardner (astronaut) (born 1948), United States Air Force officer and former astronaut
 Guy Gardner (character), DC Comics character who primarily operates as a Green Lantern
 Guy B. Gardner (1920–1980), head football coach for the Howard Payne University Yellow Jackets